S. hastata  may refer to:
 Salvinia hastata, a floating fern species in the genus Salvinia
 Selliguea hastata, a fern species

See also
 Hastata (disambiguation)